On the Roof is a 2019 Czech comedy-drama film. It stars Alois Švehlík who replaced Jan Tříska, who died before shooting started.

Plot
Antonín Rypar is an old, cantankerous university professor who lives alone. One day he finds a Vietnamese named Song on his roof, and decides to take him in.

Cast
Alois Švehlík as Antonín Rypar
Duy Anh Tran as Song
Vojtěch Dyk as Marek
Adrian Jastraban as Kokeš
Mária Bartalos as Anna

Production
The film was shot in Prague during August and September 2019. The film was adapted from a script written by Mádl in 2011 for the New York Film Academy.

References

External links
 

2019 films
Czech comedy-drama films
2019 comedy-drama films
2010s Czech-language films